John Bell Brown (21 February 1915 – 30 August 2005) was a Scottish footballer, who played as a goalkeeper. At club level he played for Clyde, Hibernian, Dundee and Kilmarnock, helping Clyde win the Scottish Cup in 1939. He also played once for the Scotland national football team, in a 1939 British Home Championship match against Wales.

Brown's football career was clearly interrupted by the Second World War, as his two greatest achievements, winning a Scotland cap and the Scottish Cup, came during the last season completed before the war. Brown only conceded one goal in the whole competition en route to winning the Scottish Cup, a penalty kick in a 4–1 win against Rangers. He later complained that he would not have conceded even that solitary goal if Rangers had used their regular penalty taker, Bob McPhail, because Brown knew where McPhail normally placed his penalties. A transfer to Arsenal was proposed, but did not materialise due to the outbreak of war in September 1939.

During the war he entered the service of the Royal Navy, while making guest appearances for Hamilton Academical. He transferred to Hibernian in 1942, but played for teams including St Mirren, Airdrieonians and Gillingham of England's Kent League between 1944 and 1946. Brown also played for touring British Army team Corinthians and for Maccabi Rishon LeZion in the Palestine League. Upon returning to Hibernian, he helped them win the Scottish league championship in 1947–48.

Brown then had spells with Dundee and Kilmarnock before retiring as a player in 1950. He then became a physiotherapist, working for Kilmarnock, the All Blacks and the Scotland national rugby union team. Brown was the first person to serve in that function for the Scotland rugby side.

At junior level, while at Glenburn, Brown was a reserve for the national team, and  played in the annual West v East of Scotland international trial. After he moved to Shawfield, Brown won all three of his Scotland Juniors caps in 1935.

Brown was part of a sizeable sporting family. His sons Peter and Gordon (Broon frae Troon) both played for Scotland at rugby union, while two of his brothers, Tom and Jim, also played professional football, as did an uncle by marriage, Alex Lambie. Jim was selected by the United States for the 1930 FIFA World Cup, and in turn his son George later also played for the USA (although born in England and raised in Scotland). Brown himself was also a talented player of both badminton and golf, playing off a scratch handicap.

Honours 

 Clyde

 Scottish Cup: 1938–39

 Paisley Charity Cup: 1939, 1940

 Hibernian 

 Scottish A Division: 1947–48

 Scotland
 British Home Championship: 1938–39

References

External links 

London Hearts profile

1915 births
2005 deaths
People from Troon
Scottish footballers
Association football goalkeepers
Clyde F.C. players
Hamilton Academical F.C. wartime guest players
St Mirren F.C. wartime guest players
Airdrieonians F.C. (1878) wartime guest players
Hibernian F.C. players
Dundee F.C. players
Gillingham F.C. wartime guest players
Kilmarnock F.C. players
Maccabi Rishon LeZion F.C. players
Scottish Football League players
Scotland international footballers
Scottish Football League representative players
Shawfield F.C. players
Footballers from South Ayrshire
Scottish Junior Football Association players
Kilmarnock F.C. non-playing staff
Scotland junior international footballers
Scotland wartime international footballers
Royal Navy personnel of World War II
Kent Football League (1894–1959) players